Robin Mann may refer to:
 Robin Mann (musician) (born 1949), Australian Christian singer and songwriter
 Robin Mann (cricketer), English cricketer played for Cambridge University Cricket Club, listed as R. D. Mann
 Robin Mann (scientist), Honorary D.Sc., University of Canterbury 2010
 Robin Mann (squash player), Indian squash player for Columbia Lions men's squash